David Row (born 1949) is a contemporary abstract painter associated with the movements of Postmodern Painting and Conceptual Abstraction. His primary aesthetic has evolved around a language of painterly fragmented geometric abstraction that is usually formed on shaped canvases and installations. Row lives and works in both New York City and Cushings Island, Maine. He is married to former AIGA NY Board president Kathleen Schenck Row.

Early life and education
Row was born in Portland but grew up in Kolkata, India. Row went on to study art receiving both his BA and MFA degrees at Yale.  During his time there he studied under Joseph Albers, Al Held, Lester Johnson, William Bailey, David von Schlegell, and Brice Marden.

Row has exhibited extensively since the late seventies starting out at alternative and nonprofit spaces such as the Drawing Center and PS122.  He has been represented at various points in his career by John Good Gallery (New York), André Emmerich (New York), von Lintel Gallery (New York), Galerie Thaddaeus Ropac (Paris/Salzburg), Ascan Crone (Hamburg), Galerie Brandstetter & Wyss (Zurich) and currently with Loretta Howard Gallery (New York), Locks Gallery (Philadelphia) and McClain Gallery (Houston).

Row is also an established printmaker working with fine art edition presses such as Pace Prints, Two Palms Press and the Tamarind Institute.

He has also received grants and awards such as Yale Scholar of the House (1971-71), National Endowment for the Arts (1987), Issac N. Maynard Prize from the National Academy Museum and School (2008).

Row has taught and lectured at The Cooper Union, Rhode Island School of Design, Pratt Institute, Fordham University and currently teaches in the School of Visual Arts MFA Program.

Work
Row's practice has evolved into a series of inquires into the nature of perception using geometry and the physicality of paint. His paintings use cropped and fragmented overlapping ovals and polygons that create visual and illusionistic tension. Charles Hagen goes on to describes the work in an Artforum review, "Row's paintings have a sense of dynamism about them as if they were constantly on the verge of becoming something else - and then, perhaps becoming themselves again,  By combining off geometric forms with richly expressive color, Row attempts to bridge the gap between systems and intuition, concept and action."

Peter Plagens writes about Row's work saying, "Row is a master of his mode, and his astute cramming of geometric shapes (ovals are a favorite) into dynamically constricting formats makes his compositions seem all the more muscular. Recently, he's been working on polygons, and his color, while measured and considerably muted by his relentless attention to the surface, is nevertheless expert and crisp."

Ken Johnson referred to the Row's imagery as, "abstract paintings in which wide, arcing bands are played off rectangular division. Broad loopy lines and straight lines are squeegeed into richly layered fields, some in bright, synthetic hues, others in black and white."

The paint application has the texture not unlike screen printed ink or stenciled wiped surface which causes the image to appear blurred or obscured.  Often marks remain from the use of such tools and other masking techniques as evidence of the process as well as aesthetic gesture. In reference to this painting critic Barry Schwabsky says, "The layering if the surface is in fact rather complex, and because Row uses the removal of the masking tape holding down the stencils as a marked steps in the painting process, the image is traversed, both at and under the surface but the grid formed 'ghosts' of the tape."

Times art critic Roberta Smith describes Row's work as, "layer together complex processes (including templates, screen printing and Richter-like blurs) with an imagery that centers on repeating open ellipses. Across separate panels and multicolored grids, and in lively contrasting colors, these ellipses disintegrate into coiled lines and then big flamelike strokes, with a centrifugal energy that can seem cinematic."

Selected solo exhibitions
2018 Loretta Howard Gallery, New York, NY
2017 Locks Gallery, Philadelphia, PA
2016 Loretta Howard Gallery, New York, NY
2014 Loretta Howard Gallery, New York, NY
2013 McClain Gallery, Houston, TX
2006 Von Lintel Gallery, New York, NY
2004 Von Lintel Gallery, New York, NY
2001 Ulrich Museum, Wichita, KS
1996 André Emmerich, New York, NY
1995 Locks Gallery, Philadelphia, PA
1995 Galerie Thomas von Lintel, Munich, Germany	
1991 Galerie Thaddaeus Ropac, Paris, France
1991 John Good Gallery, New York, NY
1991 Richard Feigen Gallery, Chicago, IL
1990 Galerie Thaddaeus Ropac, Salzburg, Austria 
1989 John Good Gallery, New York, NY
1987 John Good Gallery, New York, NY

Selected group exhibitions
2012 Conceptual Abstraction, Hunter College / Times Square Gallery, New York, NY
2011 Splendor of Dynamic Structure: Celebrating 75 Years of the American Abstract Artists, Johnson Museum of Art, Cornell University, Ithaca, NY 
1996 A Critique of Pure Abstraction, Hammer Museum, UCLA, Los Angeles, CA
1991 Conceptual Abstraction. Sidney Janis Gallery, New York, NY
1991 Strategies for the Last Painting, Feigen Gallery, Chicago, IL
1982 New Drawing in America, Drawing Center, New York, NY

Public collections
Allentown Art Museum, Allentown, PA
Brooklyn Museum
Mary and Leigh Block Museum of Art, Northwestern University, Chicago, IL
Carnegie Museum of Art, Pittsburgh, PA
The Cleveland Museum of Art, Cleveland, OH
Ulrich Museum, Wichita, Kansas
Hudson Valley MOCA, Peekskill, NY
Metropolitan Museum of Art, New York, NY
Museum of Fine Arts, Houston, TX
Portland Museum of Art, Portland, ME
Spencer Museum of Art, University of Kansas, Lawrence, KS
University Museum of Contemporary Art, UMASS, Amherst, MA
Washington National Airport, Cesar Pelli Commission, Washington, DC

References

External links

David Row Presentation at School of Visual Arts

1949 births
Living people
20th-century American painters
American male painters
21st-century American painters
20th-century American printmakers
Artists from Portland, Maine
Yale University alumni
American expatriates in India
20th-century American male artists